Malcolm Viltard (born 24 October 2002) is a French professional footballer who plays as a midfielder for  club Châteauroux on loan from Sochaux.

Career
Viltard is a youth product of ES du Fresquel, Castelnaudary, Muret, and Balma, before signing with Sochaux in January 2019. Viltard made his professional debut with Sochaux in a 4-0 Ligue 2 win over Le Havre AC on 28 November 2020.

On 7 September 2022, Viltard extended his contract with Sochaux to 2025 and was loaned to Châteauroux for the 2022–23 season.

References

External links

2002 births
People from Carcassonne
Sportspeople from Aude
Footballers from Occitania (administrative region)
Living people
French footballers
Association football midfielders
FC Sochaux-Montbéliard players
LB Châteauroux players
Ligue 2 players
Championnat National players
Championnat National 3 players